The regions represented the result of a Soviet-inspired experiment regarding the administrative and territorial organisation of the Romanian People's Republic (later Socialist Republic of Romania) between 1950 and 1968.

See also: Administrative divisions of the People's Republic of Romania.

Regions of 1950

Regiunea Arad (Ar.)
Regiunea Argeș (Ptș.)
Regiunea Bacău (Bc.)
Regiunea Baia Mare (B.Mr.)
Regiunea Bârlad (Bd.)
Regiunea Bihor (Ord.)
Regiunea Botoșani (Bt.)
Regiunea București (R.B.)
Regiunea Buzău (Bz.)
Regiunea Cluj (Clj.)
Regiunea Constanța (Cța.)
Regiunea Dolj (Cv.)
Regiunea Galați (Gl.)
Regiunea Gorj (Tg.J.)
Regiunea Hunedoara (Dv.)
Regiunea Ialomița (Cl.)
Regiunea Iași (Iș.)
Regiunea Mureș (Tg.M.)
Regiunea Prahova (Pl.)
Regiunea Putna (Fș.)
Regiunea Rodna (Btr.)
Regiunea Satu Mare (St.M.)
Regiunea Severin (Lgș.)
Regiunea Sibiu (Sb.)
Regiunea Stalin (O.S.)
Regiunea Suceava (Sv.)
Regiunea Teleorman (R.Vd.)
Regiunea Timișoara (Tmş.)
Regiunea Vâlea (Rm.V.)

Regions of 1952

September 19, 1952 – Decree nr.331. By merging, the number of regions was reduced to 18.
Regiunea Arad (Ar.)
Regiunea Bacău (Bc.)
Regiunea Baia Mare (B.Mr.)
Regiunea Bârlad (Bd.)
Regiunea București (R.B.) (Bucharest City–B.)
Regiunea Cluj (Clj.)
Regiunea Constanța (Cţa.)
Regiunea Craiova (Cv.)
Regiunea Galați (Gl.)
Regiunea Hunedoara (Dv.)
Regiunea Iași (Iș.)
Regiunea Autonomă Maghiară (Magyar Autonomous Region) (Tg.M.)
Regiunea Oradea (Ord.)
Regiunea Pitești (Ptș.)
Regiunea Ploiești (Pl.)
Regiunea Stalin (O.S.)
Regiunea Suceava (Sv.)
Regiunea Timișoara (Tmș.)

Regions of 1956

1956 – An intermediary step in which the regions Arad and Bârlad were absorbed by their neighbours.
Regiunea Argeș (Ptș.)
Regiunea Bacău (Bc.)
Regiunea Baia Mare (B. Mr.)
Regiunea București (B., Bucharest City–O.B.)
Regiunea Cluj (Clj.)
Regiunea Constanța (Cta.)
Regiunea Craiova (Cv.)
Regiunea Galați (Gl.)
Regiunea Hunedoara (Dv.)
Regiunea Iași (Iș.)
Regiunea Autonomă Maghiară (Magyar Autonomous Region) (Tg.M.)
Regiunea Oradea (Ord.)
Regiunea Ploiești (Pl.)
Regiunea Stalin (Brașov City/Orașul Stalin–O.S.) 
Regiunea Suceava (Sv.)
Regiunea Timișoara (Tmș.)

Regions of 1960

1960 – As of 24 December, the final step, with territory redistribution and some regions renamed. The Magyar administrative entity was renamed Regiunea Mureș-Autonomă Maghiară (Mureș Region – Magyar Autonomous), also modifying its territory. By the end, the number of regions was reduced to 16.
Regiunea Argeș (AG)
Regiunea Bacău (BC)
Regiunea Banat (BT)
Regiunea Brașov (BV; very briefly Br. after the name reverted to Brașov)
Regiunea București (B, including Bucharest City)
Regiunea Cluj (CJ)
Regiunea Crișana (CR)
Regiunea Dobrogea (DB)
Regiunea Galați (GL)
Regiunea Hunedoara (HD)
Regiunea Iași (IS)
Regiunea Maramureș (MR)
Regiunea Mureș-Autonomă Maghiară (Mureș Region-Magyar Autonomous) (MS)
Regiunea Oltenia (OL)
Regiunea Ploiești (PL)
Regiunea Suceava (SV)

See also
 Former administrative divisions of Romania

References

 
Romania, Former administrative divisions of